The 1939 New Brunswick general election was held on November 20, 1939, to elect 48 members to the 39th New Brunswick Legislative Assembly, the governing house of the province of New Brunswick, Canada. The Liberal government of Allison Dysart was re-elected with a reduced majority.

References

1939 elections in Canada
Elections in New Brunswick
1939 in New Brunswick
November 1939 events